The Ford Airstream is a concept car built by Ford that made its debut at the 2007 North American International Auto Show in Detroit, Michigan.  The Ford Airstream is a retro-futuristic crossover utility vehicle that was inspired by the classic Airstream recreational vehicle trailers built since the 1930s.  The modern Ford Airstream concept includes a plug-in hybrid hydrogen fuel cell drive system, called HySeries Drive, that operates exclusively on electrical power.  Ford calls the Ford Airstream Concept "a futuristic look at crossovers" as "modern touring vehicle(s)" for recreational travelers.  The concept vehicle was designed in cooperation with Airstream, a division of Thor Industries. The design and name of the Airstream were possibly influenced by the Ford Aerostar.

Powerplant
The concept vehicle is powered by a rechargeable plug-in hybrid hydrogen fuel cell drive train, called HySeries Drive. This power plant system was developed with partial funding from the United States Department of Energy, and is currently being tested on a prototype version of the Ford Edge. The Airstream Concept's wheels are driven by electric motors, which are powered by a lithium-ion battery pack. The Ballard Power Systems hydrogen fuel cell system recharges the vehicle's battery pack as needed, as a portable generator, and the vehicle can also be plugged into an AC source, to recharge between trips. The HySeries Drive delivers the equivalent of a combined city/highway equivalent fuel economy of 41 mpg (U.S.) (5.7 L/100 km). The sole exhaust emission from the operating vehicle is water vapor.

Exterior

The Ford Airstream includes asymmetric doors. The passenger side door is a power clamshell hatch that runs two-thirds the length of the vehicle for loading of passengers and cargo.  The crossover includes a rear hatch for loading cargo aft.

Interior
The  interior was inspired by spacecraft images and environments portrayed in 2001: A Space Odyssey, according to Ford.  It is described as a "lounge atmosphere", meant to provide a relaxing experience while traveling.  The instrument panel includes flush-mounted, touch-sensitive controls and a single, multi-function gauge display with primary driving information.  A center-mounted dual-view screen provides a camera view and secondary driver-oriented information, and also allows the front-seat passenger to view DVD movies and work on the Internet.

The front seats are captain's chairs that can swivel and rotate to face aft.  The rear seats are lounge-like, and includes a 360-degree viewscreen for entertainment, games, Internet access, and as a live camera feed.  The seats include four-point safety belts.

Specifications
Powertrain:  Ford/Ballard HySeries Drive plug-in hydrogen hybrid fuel cell
Chassis dimensions
Overall length: 
Wheelbase: 
Overall width: 
Overall height at curb: 
Front track width: 
Rear track width: 
Suspension
Front: Double wishbone independent suspension
Rear: Multi-link independent
Interior
Front headroom: 
Rear headroom: 
Front legroom: 
Rear headroom:

References

External links
www.airstream.com — Airstream, Inc.
www.ford.com — Ford Motor Company
media.ford.com — Ford Motor Company Media Center

Airstream
Hydrogen cars
Electric concept cars